Ahmed Ally Salum (born 28 June 1966) is a Tanzanian CCM politician and Member of Parliament for Solwa constituency since 2005.

References

1966 births
Living people
Chama Cha Mapinduzi MPs
Tanzanian MPs 2005–2010
Tanzanian MPs 2010–2015